"Calipso" is a song by Charlie Charles and Dardust featuring vocals from Sfera Ebbasta, Mahmood and Fabri Fibra. It was released on 26 April 2019 by Island Records. The song peaked at number 1 on the Italian Singles Chart.

Background and composition
The song was written by Davide Petrella, Dardust, Fabri Fibra, Mahmood, Sfera Ebbasta and Charlie Charles.
Its release was preceded by a series of teasers through Charlie Charles' social network accounts. Its title and featured artists were announced on 23 April 2019, three days before its release.

Charlie Charles described "Calipso" as "a metaphor to tell how easy it is to let yourself be tempted by the wrong roads when you are a kid which starts from the suburbs, and how easy it is to negatively judge who comes from nothing".

Music video
The music video for "Calipso", directed by Attilio Cusani, premiered on 15 May 2019 via Charlie Charles' YouTube channel.

Charts

Certifications

Release history

References

2019 songs
2019 singles
Island Records singles
Number-one singles in Italy
Songs written by Mahmood
Songs written by Fabri Fibra
Songs written by Dario Faini
Fabri Fibra songs
Mahmood (singer) songs
Sfera Ebbasta songs
Songs written by Davide Petrella